Yelang is a town in Tongzi County located to the north of the downtown Tongzi, Zunyi, Guizhou, People's Republic of China.

Transportation
Chongqing–Guiyang high-speed railway
Sichuan–Guizhou railway

References

Township-level divisions of Guizhou